Flat Island is an island of the Andaman Islands.  It belongs to the North and Middle Andaman administrative district, part of the Indian union territory of Andaman and Nicobar Islands.

Geography
And also this island wild life will be protected by the government and the flat island is also known as 2nd wild life sanctuary in the country

Administration
Politically, Flat Island is part of Rangat Tehsil.

Fauna
The island is the location of a wildlife sanctuary, although there is no station on the island.

References 

 Geological Survey of India

North and Middle Andaman district
Tourist attractions in the Andaman and Nicobar Islands
Uninhabited islands of India